Vasavad is a census town in Rajkot district in the Indian state of Gujarat..

References

Cities and towns in Rajkot district